Baltalimanı is a neighborhood at a bay of the European coast of Bosporus, in the Sarıyer district of Istanbul, Turkey. The name means "axe port" in Turkish.

The place is known for the Treaty of Balta Liman, signed between Great Britain and the Ottoman Empire in 1838.

References 

Neighbourhoods of Sarıyer
Bosphorus
Gulfs of the Mediterranean